WBRX (94.7 FM, "Mix 94.7") is a radio station broadcasting an adult contemporary format.  Licensed to the suburb of Cresson, Pennsylvania, it serves the Altoona, Pennsylvania metropolitan area.  It first began broadcasting in 1981 under the call sign WRKE.  The station is currently owned by Matt Lightner, through licensee Lightner Communications LLC.

History

94.7 History

WBRX first signed on the air in November 1981 as WRKE, founded by legendary Pittsburgh broadcaster Ed Sherlock and his business partner Neil Hart, who formed Sherlock-Hart Broadcasting the year before. On March 19, 1982, the call sign was changed from WRKE to WBXQ. In addition to owning WBXQ, both men owned WAMQ (now WYUP) in Loretto, which programmed a format of contemporary country music.

In 1990, Sherlock and Hart dissolved their partnership, with Hart leaving to pursue other interests.  WAMQ, which was falling into some financial difficulty, was sold to WBXQ Operations Manager Tom Stevens for $55,000 in July 1992.  Sherlock retained possession of WBXQ.

WBRX
According to 100000watts.com, WBRX 94.3 and WBXQ 94.7 swapped calls, retaining their classic rock simulcast, on April 27, 2007.  Fybush.com reports the call swap was apparently filed in error, as it disappeared the next day (the 28th) from the FCC database. On June 28, 2007, the WBRX and WBXQ call signs were officially swapped on 94.3 and 94.7 FM.

On October 22, 2007 WBRX split from the Q94 classic rock simulcast and switched to an adult contemporary format branded as "Mix 94.7".

On October 1, 2019, WBRX – along with WKMC, WRTA, WBXQ, and two translators – was sold to long-time broadcast engineer and business owner Matt Lightner under the company name of Lightner Communications LLC. Lightner first entered the Altoona, Pa area radio market in August 2017 with the purchase of WTRN.

Previous Logos

External links

BRX
Mainstream adult contemporary radio stations in the United States